Mickey's Garden is a 1935 American animated short film produced by Walt Disney Productions and released by United Artists. The film was the second Mickey Mouse cartoon shot in Technicolor (after The Band Concert) and is also the first color appearance of Pluto. The cartoon is also the first color cartoon where Mickey speaks (though he only does so at the end when Pluto starts licking him). The film's plot centers on Mickey Mouse trying to rid his garden of insects, but they keep coming back. When he accidentally gets hit with his own bug spray, he begins seeing a warped reality. It was the 76th Mickey Mouse short film to be released, and the fifth of that year. The only bit of dialogue is during the last 20 seconds when Mickey tells Pluto to stop licking him.

Plot
Mickey and Pluto are hunting insects in the garden. Mickey starts shooting insecticide, and the insects start shrieking and run away. Mickey, in an attempt to get rid of them all, continues shooting. But eventually, it runs out – upon seeing this, the insects come out of hiding and go back to his garden to resume eating. Mickey heads towards a big bucket of water and starts stirring some more insecticide with a broom.

Mickey comes back and tries to poison the bugs, but the pump is blocked, and Mickey tries to unblock it with wheat. Meanwhile, Pluto is following a stag beetle, which bites him on the nose. When it taunts him from atop a plant, he lunges at it, but misses and gets his head stuck inside a pumpkin. Panicking, he runs frantically in all directions, before accidentally bumping into Mickey, who gets hit by his own bug spray, and begins seeing hallucinations.

Mickey finds himself in a dangerous imaginary world where he, his house, his stuff, and Pluto have all shrunk and the bugs and plants have become giant. The giant bugs proceed to drink the insecticide, but instead of killing them, it makes them drunk. Upon noticing them, the enraged bugs begin chasing after Mickey and Pluto. After encounters with a worm and a beetle, Mickey and Pluto climb up and hide in a flower, but are attacked by a bumble bee.

Pluto lands on a branch which turns out to be a caterpillar that throws him into the air. He is then swallowed by a hiccuping firefly. Mickey lands on a leaf, but a drunk grasshopper saws off the leaf with its leg while it laughs. Mickey falls into a tomato atop a worm, in which he proceeds to ride in the style of Charlie Chaplin, and then wrestles it.

Eventually, Mickey wakes up and discovers, much to his delight, that the worm he was wrestling is actually his hose and that the whole experience was a nightmare. Pluto manages to break free from the pumpkin, inadvertently slingshoting it onto Mickey, and then begins licking him.

Voice cast
 Mickey Mouse: Walt Disney
 Pluto: Pinto Colvig

Releases
 1935 - theatrical release 
 1988 - Mickey's 60th Birthday

Home media
The short was released on December 4, 2001, on Walt Disney Treasures: Mickey Mouse in Living Color.

See also
Mickey Mouse (film series)

References

External links 
 
 

1935 short films
1935 animated films
1930s color films
1930s Disney animated short films
Animated films about insects
Films directed by Wilfred Jackson
Films produced by Walt Disney
Mickey Mouse short films
Films scored by Leigh Harline
Films about size change
Animated films about dogs
1930s American films
1930s English-language films
American comedy short films
American animated short films
Animated films about mice